Marc Lévy (born 7 August 1961 in Algiers) is a French former professional football goalkeeper who played for Marseille, Meaux and Pau.

He coached Montauban, Marseille and Pau.

References

External links
Player profile
Manager profile

Living people
1961 births
Association football goalkeepers
French footballers
Olympique de Marseille players
CS Meaux players
Pau FC players
Ligue 1 players
Ligue 2 players
French football managers
Olympique de Marseille managers
Pau FC managers
Footballers from Algiers
21st-century Algerian people